Justice Pao is a 236-episode television series from Taiwan, first airing on Chinese Television System (CTS) from February 1993 to January 1994.

Background
The show stars Jin Chao-chun as the legendary Song dynasty official Bao Zheng. It was hugely popular in many countries in East Asia and Southeast Asia.

The series was originally planned to have just 15 episodes. However, the show had high ratings when the initial episodes aired. Due to its popularity, CTS extended the show to 236 episodes.

The rival TVB and ATV Home networks in Hong Kong both bought the series in an attempt to gain viewers. Competition between the two networks during the series’ run was so intense that identical episodes were shown on both channels on the same night. It was also one of the first dramas that used NICAM technology (Dual Sound Switch Cantonese/Mandarin).

List of cases

Cast
 Note: Some cast members played multiple roles.

Awards
1995 – 30th Golden Bell Awards
 Won – Jin Chao-chun, Best Actor
 Won – Tai Chih-yuan, Best Supporting Actor, for the portrayal of Guo Huai (Case 3)
 Won – Liu Ming, Best Supporting Actress, for the portrayal of Bao Mian's mother (Case 8)

Theme songs
1. The opening theme, performed by Hu Kua, has the same title as the series. It was originally performed by Chiang Kuang-Chao for the earlier 1974 CTS series also of the same name.
 A Cantonese cover ("願世間有青天") performed by George Lam with lyrics by Wong Jim was the opening theme of the series on TVB in Hong Kong. It was also the opening theme of the 1995 TVB series Justice Bao.
 Another Cantonese cover by Ray Lui was the opening theme of the 1995 ATV series Justice Bao.
 A Tagalog cover ("Judge Bao") was the opening theme of the series on ABC-5 in the Philippines.
 Andy Lau covered the song in the 2003 Bao Zheng-related movie Cat and Mouse.
 Cambodian version was performed by Nou Sib which aired on CTV9 in 1994 and Neay Koy which air on CTN in 2020 (as he performed in 2001)
2. The ending theme was "New Dream of the Butterfly Lovers", written and performed by Huang An.
 This song became a huge hit in the Chinese-speaking world, and Huang's album with the same name became one of the best-selling albums in Taiwan, selling over a million copies.
 Cover versions in many languages exist due to the show's influence in the region. Kenny Ho recorded a Cantonese version (also "新鴛鴦蝴蝶夢") with lyrics by Albert Leung, while Huang An and Loletta Lee each recorded a different Cantonese version (both titled "愛於錯誤年代" but the lyrics differ). A popular English version from the Singaporean band Tokyo Square was titled "Can't Let Go". Huang An's own English version was titled "When It Comes to Love". There are also versions in Hokkien ("鴛鴦蝴蝶夢" by Joice Lim), Thai ("สุดจะหยุดใจ" by Koong Tuangsith Reamchinda), Vietnamese ("Uyên Ương Hồ Điệp Mộng" by Đan Trường), Khmer ("ផ្ការោយមុនរដូវ" by Nou Sib and "ព្រួយជាមួយចន្ទ" by Khemarak Sereymon) and Indonesian ("Melody Memory" by Lavenia), among others.
3. Another ending theme song used for some episodes was "Hand in Hand, Let's Travel the World".

International broadcast 
: Channel 9
 : Indonesian Educational Television (1995).
: Myawady Television (1998), Myanmar Radio and Television (2016 - with Burmese dub), Sky Net Channel 9 Myanmar (2019)
: RPN (1996-2000),  ABC 5 (2007-2008) 
: Channel 8 
: Channel 3 (1995-October 1, 2015.
: NEW18 (April 6, 2020 - March 28, 2021 (Every Monday - Sunday from 16: 35-17: 35))

Video game adaptations 
On the first few years after its original run ended, at least three video game adaptations of the series were published in Asia. It is unknown if any of them were licensed by CTS.

The first adaptation was the homonymous beat 'em up 包青天 (Bāo Qīng Tiān), published in 1994 by Bit Corporation for the Gamate handheld console in Taiwan. It is the only one out of the three that was licensed by the console manufacturer. Its higher quality and overall polish and country of origin may also be a pointer for it being officially licensed by CTS, although that is uncertain.

The second and third adaptations were both released in mainland China in 1996 for the Nintendo Entertainment System, and it is unclear which went to market first. The most well-known out of the two, usually cited as the first, is a platformer also titled Bāo Qīng Tiān, published by Kai Sheng in Hong Kong and by Family TSI in Thailand. The second is a fighting game titled Impartial Judge, published by Fuzhou Waixing in China.

References

External links 
 

Fictional depictions of Bao Zheng in television
1993 Taiwanese television series debuts
1994 Taiwanese television series endings
Taiwanese wuxia television series
Fantasy television series
Ghosts in television
Demons in television
1990s crime drama television series
Television shows set in Kaifeng
1990s Taiwanese television series